The Last Man is a 1932 American mystery film directed by Howard Higgin and starring Charles Bickford, Constance Cummings and Alec B. Francis.

Cast
 Charles Bickford as Bannister
 Constance Cummings as 	Marian
 Alec B. Francis as Mr. Wingate
 Alan Roscoe as 	Marsden
 Robert Ellis as 	English Charlie
 James Wang as 	Won-Le-Ton
 William A. Williams a s.	Gibbs 
 Jack Carlyle as 	1st Mate of the Glencoe
 John Eberts as 	Egyptian Spy
 Kit Guard as 1st Mate of the Ballentyne
 Edward LeSaint as	Captain of the Glencoe 
 George Magrill as 	2nd Mate of the Ballentyne
 Hal Price as Captain of the Ballentyne
 Jack Richardson as Doctor
 Albert J. Smith as 	Halborn
 Robert St. Angelo as 	Joe 
 William Sundholm as Swede

References

Bibliography
 Alan G. Fetrow. Sound films, 1927-1939: a United States Filmography. McFarland, 1992.

External links
 

1932 films
1930s mystery films
American mystery films
Films directed by Howard Higgin
Columbia Pictures films
American black-and-white films
1930s English-language films
1930s American films
Films with screenplays by Francis Edward Faragoh